Fally Ipupa N'simba (born December 14, 1977), known by his stage name Fally Ipupa, is a Congolese singer-songwriter, dancer, philanthropist, guitarist and producer. From 1999 until 2006, he was a member of Quartier Latin International, the music band formed in 1986 by Koffi Olomidé.

His first solo album was Droit Chemin released in 2006, which went on to sell over 100,000 units, and his second album Arsenal de Belles Melodies was released in 2009. In 2007, Fally Ipupa won the Kora Awards for Best Artist or Group from Central Africa.

In 2010, Fally Ipupa won the MTV Africa Music Awards 2010 for Best Video for "Sexy Dance" and Best Francophone Artist. He won the urban awards for Best African Artist.

Fally Ipupa was nominated in the Best Live Act category at the MTV Africa Music Awards 2014. He released an album named Power "Kosa Leka" in 2013.

On October 10, 2022, Fally Ipupa's album Tokooos was certified Gold by SNEP in France, 5 years after its release.

Early life
Fally Ipupa Nsimba was born on December 14, 1977 in Kinshasa, Democratic Republic of Congo in a large family. Having been raised in a Catholic family, he began singing in the church choir. In adolescence, he began his musical career in various small groups in Kinshasa, and in the mid-1990s his voice attracted attention and he eventually joined local groups, including "New City" or "New Covenant". In the late 1990s, he joined the nationally recognized "Latent Talent", with whom he recorded his first album.

Quartier Latin International

In the late 1990s, he joined Quartier Latin International founded by Koffi Olomide. Ipupa became "conductor of the orchestra". Ipupa included his composition "Eternelement" in the Force de frappe album. He was also known for duets with Koffi Olomide in Effrakata especially the track "Effervescent" in 2001. As with many other Congolese stars, the public liked to have nicknames for artists and soon he was called "Di Caprio", "Anelka" and "The Great One". With success in the orchestra, he also promoted his solo projects including his album Droit Chemin, Arsenal des Belles mélodies , Power, Tokos and Control. He has been involved in the planning of the commemoration of the band's 30th anniversary, despite having quit the band in 2006. On may 8 1988 he started a very good job. He worked for Kim Kardashian As a feet picture taker.

Solo career

In 2006, he released his first solo album Droit Chemin, produced by David Monsoh Obouo of Music. He collaborated with Maddy Munan, Krys, Mokobé of 113 and Ben J of Neg 'Marrons, including songs like Liputa, Orgasy and Sopeka emerging in the DR Congo and other parts of Africa. He got a gold record for having sold more than 100,000 copies.

Fally has received numerous awards and nominations: he won the Césaire music Male Artist of the Year, in Paris, two Black Music Awards for Male Artist of the Year, Best clip in Benin, and Male Artist of the year in Ivory Coast.

Arsenal de Belles Melodies "A2BM" and Power "Kosa Leka"
Three years after the release of Droit Chemin (Straight Path), Ipupa released a second album of 16 tracks called Arsenal De Belles Melodies (French for "arsenal of beautiful melodies") acronymed as "A2BM." It was the second album by Ipupa to be produced by David Monsoh. In this album, Olivia Longott, American singer (former member of G-Unit by 50 Cent ) was featured on the lead single Chaise Électrique and dancehall artist Krys was featured on "Sexy Dance" for the second consecutive time after the success of "Droit Chemin Remix".

He won his second gold drive through this album with over 100,000 copies sold, including 40,000 in one week, a record for a Congolese artist.

He has won numerous trophies, such as: 3 Ndule awards 2010 ("Best Album", "Best Video" and "Best Song"), "Micro Gold", "Best Artist Central Africa" in the Soundcity Music Video Awards (SMVA 2010), Double Mama in the MTV Africa Music Awards 2010, Best Francophone Artist, Best Music Video: "Sexy Dance", four trophies in the Moamas Awards, two Okapi Awards 2011, appointed Nostalgies Music Awards 2012.

On April 4, 2013, he released his third album Power "Kosa Leka" which contained 22 tracks.

Ipupa collaborated with Bigg masta G (Muana Mboka) on the "Ndoki" remix. The instrumental for the remix was modified and parts of Ipupa's vocals was cut out of the song and replaced by Bigg masta G's rap parts. The cover of the remix shows the word "Ndoki" between Ipupa and Bigg masta G. Congolese rumba singer MJ30, Poison Mobutu & Mami Wata also made a remix of the song. On MJ30's remix, Fally Ipupa's vocals are completely excluded; instead, MJ30 herself sings the chorus.

The official video for the song "Ndoki" garnered more than 150,000 views on YouTube in less than a week (a record for a Congolese artist). May 14, 2013, Fally won the trophy for "Best African Artist" at the first edition of Trace Urban Music Awards.

Ipupa signed a contract for three albums (World Version) in April 2013 with Universal (Label AZ). This signified the steady rise in the encompassing of African music by the label. Of particular note is the featuring of American rapper, Eve, in the track "Sex'plosif", during the show Guest Star Trace TV in February 2013.

Ipupa participated in MTV Africa All Stars on May 18, 2013 at Moses Mabhida stadium in Durban. He also participated in the project "Doc Agric", towards the development of good agricultural practices in Africa to ratings of several African artists D'banj and Tiken Jah Fakoly.

On May 5, 2014, Ipupa posted his new title track "Original" on his Facebook page and YouTube channel. In the video, the singers Zouk Lynnsha and Fanny J are featured dancing to the song, as well as basketball player "OKC Thunder"'s Serge Ibaka. This track includes scenes from Ipupa's previous live shows in the African cities: Kinshasa, Brazzaville, Dakar, Douala, Abidjan, Luanda and others. The song's rhythm highlights the folk style of African music, especially the Ecuador DRC music style. The song reached the milestone of 1 million views in three months on YouTube. The song is noted for revolutionizing the ndombolo genre of music,which had been experiecing a slow decline due to emigration of Congolese artistes to Europe.

Fally Ipupa won the Best Artist category for Central Africa in the Afrimma Awards held in Dallas in July 2014. He then travelled to Washington, D.C. as part of the US-Africa Summit meeting, for which President Obama had invited 47 African leaders for the period August 4 to 6, 2014. According to the White House, this meeting was convened to strengthen ties between Africa and the United States. A dozen African artists were selected to attend, including Fally Ipupa, the only invited artist from Central Africa.

Tokooos, Control and Tokooos II 
In July 2017, Ipupa released his fourth album Tokooos which is his first urban album. A year after this, he made a comeback to the traditional Congolese rumba and Ndombolo with his fifth album Control released in November 2018.

In December 2020, Ipupa released his sixth album Tokooos II which is his second urban album which contains 16 songs in the digital edition and 22 songs on physical edition, including 4 features with Dadju, Naza (rapper), Ninho and M. Pokora.

On February 25, 2022, Fally Ipupa released Tokooos 2 Gold, the reissue of his Tokooos album released a year earlier, with 15 additional titles which are added to the list of 26 songs released in the Tokooos 2 album.

Formule 7 
Fally Ipupa announced this October 17, 2022 on the set of the French television channel France 24, the release of his 7th solo album entitled Formula 7.

On Friday December 16, Fally Ipupa released his album Formule 7, the seventh album of his career. This 100 percent rumba album follows his urban album Tokooos II. The artist made more than 3 million streams on Spotify in 24 hours with his album Formule 7 and was at the top of sales on iTunes France.

Pentecost Martyrs Stadium of Kinshasa (June 2016 - October 2022) 
To celebrate his ten-year career, Fally Ipupa announced on February 29, 2016 his concert at the Martyrs stadium for June 25, 2016, with a capacity of 80,000 seats. After months of promotion, the event is canceled by the municipal authorities of the city of Kinshasa for the reason of the renovation works in the enclosure of the stadium.

After his concert at the Accor Arena on February 28, 2020, he again announces a concert at the Martyrs stadium for April 18, 2020. This time the concert will be postponed due to confinement and sanitary conditions related to COVID-19.

On March 1, 2022, he announced on social networks his concert for October 29. He begins a world tour from June 4 to October 3 with concerts in Angola, Germany, Belgium, the Netherlands via Congo Brazzaville before going through Canada and the United States. On October 29, he delivered his concert in front of more than 120,000 spectators. On stage, he is accompanied by singer Charlotte Dipanda, his former colleagues from the Latin Quarter, Gaz Mawete and Awilo Longomba. Producers Dany Synthé and Seysey also made the trip. Claudy Siar and Juliette Fievet give him in front of the Congolese public, the gold record of his album Tokooos certified in France on October 10, 2022 by SNEP with more than 50,000 sales.

At least eleven people died on Saturday, October 29, in a stampede during singer Fally Ipupa's concert in Kinshasa's largest stadium, according to the Deputy Divisional Commissioner of the Congolese National Police (PNC) and Chief of Police.

Discography

Albums

Singles

As lead artist

As featured artist

Awards and nominations

See also

References

1977 births
Living people
People from Kinshasa
21st-century Democratic Republic of the Congo male singers
Democratic Republic of the Congo songwriters
Soukous musicians
Democratic Republic of the Congo guitarists
Quartier Latin International
Male singer-songwriters
Male guitarists
21st-century guitarists